Gordon Lewis "Sea-Going" Wallace (August 6, 1899 – July 9, 1931) was an American football player. He played college football for the University of Rochester and was captain of the 1922 Rochester football team. He later played professional football a back for the Rochester Jeffersons in the National Football League (NFL). He appeared in three NFL games during the 1923 and 1924 seasons. After retiring from football, he worked as a high school teacher in Rochester. He died in 1932 while inflating a tire that exploded.

References

1899 births
1931 deaths
Rochester Jeffersons players
Players of American football from New York (state)